Mavroudis is a surname and given name of Greek-language origin. Notable people with the surname include:

Surname

Maria Mavroudi (born 1967), Greek-born American historian and linguist
Michael Mavroudis (died 1544), Greek martyr
Notis Mavroudis (1945–2023), Greek composer and musician
Pavlos Mavroudis (born 2001), Greek footballer

Given name
Mavroudis Bougaidis (born 1993), Greek footballer
Mavroudis Voridis (born 23 August 1964), Greek politician and lawyer

Greek-language surnames